Clayton Banking Company Building is a historic bank building located at Clayton, Johnston County, North Carolina.  It was built in 1919–1920, and is a two-story rectangular brick block faced with Indiana limestone  in the Beaux-Arts style.  The front facade includes a pair of three-quarter Ionic order columns "in antis" framing the double front doors. The building houses the Clayton Chamber of Commerce.

It was listed on the National Register of Historic Places in 1996.

References

External links
Clayton Chamber of Commerce website

Bank buildings on the National Register of Historic Places in North Carolina
Beaux-Arts architecture in North Carolina
Commercial buildings completed in 1920
Buildings and structures in Johnston County, North Carolina
National Register of Historic Places in Johnston County, North Carolina